Domestic partnership in Washington may refer to:

 Domestic partnership in Washington (state)
 Domestic partnership in Washington, D.C.